RPM Orchestra is a proto-Industrial Americana music quintet based in Phoenix, Arizona.

The orchestra composes and performs original scores to accompany films of the Silent Era, provides musical scores in collaborative multidisciplinary performances, records soundtrack music for contemporary films, and regularly performs at various music venues.

Origins and history

Started in late 2008 as a studio project by Pete Petrisko, the orchestra transformed into a live multiple-member ensemble in 2009. Its line-up varied, between three and seven musicians, until 2012, when group membership solidified with Petrisko, Jim Dustan, Jocelyn Ruiz, and Vic Void playing together regularly. Erik Hunter joined in 2014, officially making the ensemble a quintet.

Cited as a "band staffed by futurists and dadaists who take the sounds of the past and filter them into the heads of today's audiences", the orchestra is most identified with dieselpunk music - combining elements of Jazz, Swing, and Bluegrass commonly found during the Diesel Era, with its own unique instrumentation and avant-garde composition. Additionally, it draws from the "noise" aesthetic of Proto-Industrial music  harkening back to the Russian avant-garde period.

The orchestra favors Electroacoustic music and Acousmatic sound techniques, and the use of contact microphones, in addition to traditional instruments, when creating elements of its music. Its eclectic sound has not gone unnoticed, RPM Orchestra holds distinction as the "Oddest Band in Phoenix".

Best known for composing original scores to accompany films of the Silent Era, performed in front of a theater audience during screenings, RPM Orchestra was awarded Best of Phoenix 2018 - Best Live Accompaniment by Phoenix New Times, which wrote, "Combining old-timey instrumentation with radio sounds, haunting samples, and modern noise, RPM creates compelling and timeless soundscapes."

Discography

Albums

Afterglow (2009, Onewordlong)
Roundabout (2010, suRRism-Phonoethics)
Blossoms (2012, Absence of Wax)
Three Uses of the Knife (2013, Sirona Records)
Hit on all Sixes (2015, 56th Street Records)
Canary (2015, suRRism-Phonoethics)
Stepwise (2017, Onus Records)

EPs

Live orchestra's 10th Anniversary double-release:

Singles (2019, self-released)
Tenfold (2019, self-released)

Compilations

The Sepiachord Almanac (2012)
When in AZ Vol. 2 (2018)

Film scores

RPM Orchestra is listed in the Silent Film Musicians Directory, a comprehensive worldwide compendium of modern-day silent film musicians and composers.

Silent Era feature film scores

Tod Browning's The Unknown (1927), premiered 2011.
D.W. Griffith's Broken Blossoms (1919), premiered 2012.
W.W. Young's Alice in Wonderland (1915), premiered 2012, 2nd performance in 2018.
F.W. Murnau's Faust (1926), premiered 2013, multidisciplinary performance with Dulce Dance, and poets Jack Evans and Ernesto Moncada.
Robert Wiene's The Cabinet of Dr. Caligari (1920), premiered 2014, with two additional performances in 2017.
Buster Keaton's Go West (1925), premiered 2015.
Paul Leni's The Cat and the Canary (1927), premiered 2015.
J. Searle Dawley's Snow White (1916), premiered 2016.
F.W. Murnau's Nosferatu (1922), premiered 2016, 2nd performance in 2019.
Holger-Madsen's A Trip to Mars (1918), premiered 2017.
Wallace Worsley's The Penalty (1920), premiered 2018.
Rupert Julian's The Phantom of the Opera (1925), premiered 2018.
Fred C. Newmeyer and Sam Taylor's Safety Last! (1923), premiered 2019.

Silent Era short film scores

Luis Buñuel and Salvador Dalí's Un Chien Andalou (1929), premiered 2012.
Hal Roach's It's A Gift (1923) starring Snub Pollard, premiered 2018.
Georges Méliès' A Trip to the Moon (1902), premiered 2019.
Edwin S. Porter and Wallace McCutcheon's Dream of a Rarebit Fiend (1906), premiered 2019.
Edwin S. Porter's The Great Train Robbery (1903), premiered 2019.

Contemporary film scores

Deserted (2014) - Bandersnatch Media
Unspoken (2018) - a film short by Pete Petrisko
Fever Broke at Five Past the Hour (2019) - a film short by Pete Petrisko

Multidisciplinary performances

BUTOH + MUSIC (Premiered 2012).  A Butoh dance and music collaboration with choreographer/dancer Debra Minghi, performed live as part of Phoenix's Art Detour 24. The performance was recorded by several cameras, including audience cellphones, and edited into a stand-alone film .
Faust (Premiered 2013) A multidisciplinary silent film performance with Dulce Dance, and poets Jack Evans and Ernesto Moncada.
Animalogue (Premiered 2013) A performance choreographed by Debra Minghi, three dancers combining elements of classical ballet, animal posturing, and folklorico dance, with a live musical score by RPM Orchestra. Multicultural in scope and primal by nature; it examined animal hierarchy (i.e. the food chain), social status control issues, gender politics (from role reversal to androgyny) with elements of our analog past transformed into our digital future. This performance was funded via the National Endowment for the Arts' Our Town grant program, as part of Roosevelt Row CDC's A.R.T.S. project series.
Marching In Circles Marching Band (2015) A multi-location marching performance, in which the band (with four additional musicians) visited & played in three distinct districts in Phoenix (Roosevelt Row, Lower Grand Ave, and Midtown) on the same night.

References

External links
 Official Website: Official Website
 Official Social Media: Official Social Media
  Investigation of Memory Theory and Practice in a Performance Context

Musical groups from Phoenix, Arizona
American experimental musical groups
American industrial music groups